The 2009 Autobacs Super GT Series was the seventeenth season of the Japan Automobile Federation Super GT Championship including the All Japan Grand Touring Car Championship (JGTC) era and the fifth season as the Super GT series. It marked as well as the twenty-seventh season of a JAF-sanctioned sports car racing championship dating back to the All Japan Sports Prototype Championship. The season opener on March 22, was moved to Okayama, due to the continued renovation of Suzuka in preparation for the 2009 Japanese Grand Prix. The season finale on November 8 also was moved to Motegi, instead of Fuji. Due to the worldwide economic crisis, race weekends were two days instead of three.

André Lotterer and Juichi Wakisaka claimed the GT500 title in the Petronas TOM'S Lexus SC430. The team also won their respective teams title. Manabu Orido and Tatsuya Kataoka won the GT300 title in the Racing Project Bandoh IS350 by three points from Nobuteru Taniguchi and Ryo Orime.

Car development

GT500 class
Originally the three makers agreed to unify engine specification to 3.4L V8 engines (the same configuration of Formula Nippon at the time). However, due to the aforementioned economic crisis, Nissan encountered difficulties to develop a suitable engine for their GT-R, and chose to bear a performance ballast while using the same engine as last year. Honda continued to use their mid-engine NSX with performance ballast as the regulations originally planned to mandate front-engine cars. This was also their last year in Super GT with the original NSX, as they announced they would use a new vehicle (the HSV-010) starting in the 2010 season. Honda returned with the NSX in 2014 following the unveiling of the second-generation concept car in 2014, later revised to be based on the production model in 2017; both of which ran midship engine layout until 2019 season.

Team Nova entered the series with a Le Mans spec Aston Martin DBR9. It was the first Aston Martin car to participate the series history (including JGTC), and also the first European and non-Honda/Nissan/Toyota car in GT500 since the 2006 season (a Maserati MC12 did participate the pre-season test in 2006 season but withdraw from the series later). The DBR9 only ran at the first round at Okayama and the two rounds at Fuji, and as of July 2020 is the last non-Japanese car to compete in GT500.

GT300 class
The apr Racing Team, which had used the Toyota MR-S for a long time decided to discontinue their use of MR-S, and for this season decided to replace it with a mid-engined Toyota Corolla Axio instead.

The Cusco, the only team using an AWD car (Subaru Impreza), left the series as they wanted to concentrate on off-road events. However, Subaru cars were not absent from the series as R&D Sport used a Legacy B4 for round 6, 7 and 9.

Thunder Asia Racing, a team from Singapore, entered round 4 at Sepang with a Mosler MT900R. Their full participation in 2010 season was confirmed after the 2009 season ended.

Weight ballast changes
In order to combat sandbagging, where a team would intentionally perform poorly in order to secure a more favorable weight handicap, the success ballast formula was changed starting from this season: the ballast would be halved in the penultimate race and lifted altogether in final race for teams that participated in every round of the season. Teams missing only one round receive halved-ballast in the final race instead.

Drivers and teams

GT500

GT300

Schedule

As a measure of cost reduction, the two longest race, as well as the final race in the series' distance in the series was shortened in this season. This included the trimming of the traditional 1000km race in Suzuka to 700 km. However, to avoid 1-pit strategy that caused unfairness to some teams, teams were required to pit twice in the Fuji 400 km race.

Season Winners

Standings

GT500 Drivers
Scoring system

GT300 Drivers
Scoring system

External links
 Super GT official website 

2009
Super GT